German submarine U-81 was a Type VIIC U-boat of the navy (Kriegsmarine) of Nazi Germany during World War II, famous for sinking the aircraft carrier HMS Ark Royal.

Design
German Type VIIC submarines were preceded by the shorter Type VIIB submarines. U-81 had a displacement of  when at the surface and  while submerged. She had two shafts and two  propellers.

U-81 was fitted with five  torpedo tubes (four fitted at the bow and one at the stern), fourteen torpedoes, one  SK C/35 naval gun, 220 rounds, and a  C/30 anti-aircraft gun. The boat had a complement of between forty-four and sixty.

Building and commissioning
She was ordered on 25 January 1939 and laid down on 11 May 1940 at Bremer Vulkan, Bremen-Vegesack, becoming yard number 9. She was launched on 22 February 1941 and commissioned under her first commander, Oberleutnant zur See (Oblt.z.S.) Friedrich Guggenberger, on 26 April of that year. Guggenberger commanded her for her work-ups with the 1st U-boat Flotilla between 26 April and 31 July 1941. She then became a front (operational) boat of the 1st U-boat Flotilla, and set out on a number of training patrols.

Service history

Early patrols
Her first successes came on her second patrol, which took her from Trondheim into the North Sea and the North Atlantic, before putting into the French port of Brest. During the patrol she attacked Convoy SC 42. She sank the cargo ship Empire Springbuck on 9 September, followed by the motor ship Sally Maersk on 10 September, for a combined total of 8,843 GRT.

U-81 was one of the U-boats ordered into the Mediterranean. Her first attempt to break into the 'Italian Lake' almost ended in disaster, when on 30 October she was attacked and severely damaged by a British Catalina of No. 209 Squadron RAF, as she attempted to cross the Strait of Gibraltar. The Catalina was joined by a Lockheed Hudson, which dropped depth charges onto U-81 causing severe damage and forcing her to return to Brest. There she was repaired to return to the Mediterranean.

Sinking the Ark Royal

On 4 November U-81 left Brest bound for La Spezia in Italy. On 13 November off Gibraltar, she encountered the inbound ships of Force H. She fired a single torpedo into the aircraft carrier , and then avoided depth charge attacks from the escorts. Despite efforts to salvage her, the Ark Royal had to be abandoned 12 hours after the attack and capsized two hours later and sank. Only one man was killed, by the torpedo explosion. U-81 reached La Spezia on 1 December, where she joined the 29th U-boat Flotilla.

Patrols in the Mediterranean
Her next patrol was uneventful and resulted in no ships attacked. She sailed again on 4 April 1942 and headed into the eastern Mediterranean. On 16 April she sank the Egyptian sailing ships Bab el Farag and Fatouh el Kher, as well as the British Caspia and the Free French anti-submarine naval trawler . U-81 sank a further two Egyptian sailing ships, Hefz el Rahman on 19 April and the El Saadiah on 22 April. The U-boat put into port at Salamis in Greece on 25 April, having spent 22 days at sea and sunk 7,582 GRT of shipping. A further patrol from Salamis was uneventful and she returned to La Spezia on another patrol, which saw the sinking of the British Havre on 10 June. U-81s next patrol was into the western Mediterranean. She sank the British Garlinge on 10 November and went on to intercept one of the convoys of Operation Torch (the invasion of French North Africa), sinking the Maron on 13 November.

U-81s next patrol was uneventful and saw her briefly shift operations to Pola (now Pula, Croatia). On 25 December Oblt.z.S. Johann-Otto Krieg took command of U-81 from Guggenberger. She sailed from Pola on 30 January 1943 on her next patrol. On 10 February she damaged the Dutch Saroena and on 11 February she sank four sailing vessels, the Egyptian Al Kasbanah and Sabah el Kheir, the Lebanese Husni and the Palestinian Dolphin. U-81 put into Salamis on 19 February after 21 days at sea, 388 GRT of shipping sunk and 6,671 GRT damaged. Her next patrol sank three more Egyptian sailing vessels, the Bourghieh, the Mawahab Allah and the Rousdi. Her next patrol brought more substantial results, sinking the British troopship  on 17 June killing 484 people, followed by the Egyptian sailing vessel Nisr on 25 June and the Syrian sailing vessels Nelly and Toufic Allah on 26 June. On 27 June she sank the Greek Michalios, but was engaged by shore-based guns off Latakia. Her next patrol saw only the Empire Moon hit on 22 July, but she was declared a total loss and spent the rest of the war under repair. The U-boat's next three patrols were uneventful but on 18 November she sank the cargo ship .

Sinking
US bombers attacked U-81 while the submarine was in port in Pola, at 1130hrs on 9 January 1944. She sank with two of her crew dead and 51 survivors. The wreck was raised on 22 April 1944 and broken up. She had conducted 17 patrols, sinking 26 ships totalling 42,934 GRT and 22,600 tons, damaging one other totalling 6,671 GRT and causing one total loss totalling 7,472 GRT.

Summary of raiding history

References

Notes

Citations

Bibliography

External links

German Type VIIC submarines
U-boats commissioned in 1941
U-boats sunk in 1944
World War II submarines of Germany
1941 ships
Ships built in Bremen (state)
U-boats sunk by US aircraft
Maritime incidents in January 1944